This is a list of music awards and nominations received by Ghanaian musician Kofi Kinaata.

Kofi Kinaata is the only Ghanaian musician who has won the VGMA Songwriter of the Year award four times. In 2021, he won the "Vodafone Green Award", an award-giving to musicians for using their craft to drive environmental awareness and sustainability on the planet.

Awards and nominations

Africa Entertainment Legend Awards

All Africa Music Awards

Ghana Music Awards

Central Music Awards

Ghana Music Awards UK

Ghana Music Honors

Ghana Entertainment Awards

Western Music Awards

Ghana Event Awards

3 Music Awards

Ghana Tertiary Awards

Muse Africa

MTN 4Syte TV Music Video Awards

National Gospel Music Awards

Ghana Actors and Entertainers Awards

Western Showbiz Awards

Ghana Music Awards USA

EMY Africa

Youth Excellence Awards

References 

Kofi Kinaata